The Catholic Church in the Gambia is part of the worldwide Catholic Church, under the spiritual leadership of the Pope in Rome. The Diocese of Banjul covers the whole of the country.

History

The history of the Catholic Church in the Gambia is closely linked to Senegal. In 1445 Portuguese arrived on the coast of West Africa with the first attempts of Evangelism. Further attempts at evangelism would be carried out by French missionaries in 1849. Between 1849 and 1949, Catholicism was largely limited to Banjul.

From the ecclesiastical point of view, only in 1931 was born the mission of the Gambia, entrusted to the Congregation of the Holy Spirit, detached from the Apostolic vicariate of Senegambia. In 1951 was erected the Apostolic Prefecture of Bathurst (now Banjul), which became a diocese in 1957 immediately subject to Holy See. 

In 1992 Pope John Paul II visited Gambia and gave further impetus to the interest in Christian-Muslim relations within the Catholic community. The Pope stressed the importance of the good relations existing between the two. He stated “we are all pilgrims on the path of seeking to do God’s will in everything. Although we differ in many ways, there are important elements of our respective faiths which can serve as a basis for fruitful dialogue and a strengthening of the spirit of tolerance and mutual help”. He met with leaders of the Muslim community, and Muslims were present at the Mass he celebrated at the Independence Stadium while in the Gambia.

Organization and institutions

In 2008 the Catholic Church is present in the territory with the sole Diocese of Banjul, immediately subject to the Holy See.

At the end of 2004 the Catholic Church of The Gambia counted:
 56 parishes
 26 priests
 42 religious sisters
 57 schools
 9 charities.

The Catholic population amounted to 34,400 Christians, equal to 2.10% of the population.

The episcopate of the Gambia is part of the Catholic Church in Inter-territorial Catholic Bishops' Conference of The Gambia and Sierra Leone.

Interfaith relations 
Gambia is a predominantly Muslim country (approximately 94% of the population). Relations between the Muslim and Christian communities in Gambia are generally very good. The Catholic Church operates various missions including schools which children of Muslim parents attend. Of the minority Christian population, there are around 30,000 Catholics, which represents around 2% of the population.

See also
 Apostolic Nunciature to Gambia

Bibliography 

Guide of the Catholic missions in 2005, by the Congregation for the evangelizatione gentium, Rome, Urban University Press, 2005.

References

External links
 http://www.gcatholic.org/dioceses/country/GM.htm 
 http://www.catholic-hierarchy.org/country/gm.html 

 
Gambia